Dick Snoek (4 April 1926 – 16 November 2002) was a Dutch footballer. He played in three matches for the Netherlands national football team from 1950 to 1951.

References

External links
 

1926 births
2002 deaths
Dutch footballers
Netherlands international footballers
Place of birth missing
Association footballers not categorized by position